The Sanitarium Health and Wellbeing Company is the trading name of two sister food companies (Australian Health and Nutrition Association Ltd and New Zealand Health Association Ltd). Both are wholly owned by the Seventh-day Adventist Church.

Founded in Melbourne, Victoria, in 1898, Sanitarium has factories in Australia and New Zealand, producing a large range of breakfast cereals and vegetarian products. All the food products it manufactures and markets are plant derived or vegetarian. Its flagship product is Weet-Bix, sold in the Australian and New Zealand breakfast cereal markets.

History

During his time in Australia, William C. White convinced Seventh-day Adventist Edward Halsey, a baker at John Harvey Kellogg's Battle Creek Sanitarium, to emigrate to Australia.

Halsey arrived in Sydney, New South Wales, on 8 November 1897. He rented a small bakery in Melbourne, and produced granola (made of wheat, oats, maize, and rye) and Granose (the unsweetened forerunner to Weet-Bix). Halsey and his team sold it from door to door as an alternative to the fat-laden and nutrient-poor foods popular at the time.

The business relocated to larger premises in Cooranbong, New South Wales, next to the campus of the seminary which became Avondale University College.

In 1900, Halsey transferred to New Zealand, where he began making the first batches of Granola, New Zealand's first breakfast cereal, Caramel Cereals (a coffee substitute), and wholemeal bread in a small wooden shed in the Christchurch suburb of Papanui.

Sanitarium New Zealand and Sanitarium Australia are now separate companies, but work together.

Sanitarium has factories in several locations, including Berkeley Vale in New South Wales; Carmel in Perth, Western Australia; Brisbane, Queensland; and Auckland, New Zealand. Weet-Bix was originally manufactured, from 1928, at 659 Parramatta Road, Leichhardt, where until recent times Sanitarium signage could still be seen. This factory predates the purchase of Weet-Bix by Sanitarium in 1930. A factory was operating in Palmerston North in New Zealand, but closed in the late 1990s. The Hackney factory in Adelaide, South Australia was closed in October 2010, and the Cooranbong factory in 2018.

In June 2017, Sanitarium caused controversy when it objected to a specialty shop-owner based in Christchurch, New Zealand, trying to import 300 boxes of Weetabix into the country. New Zealand Customs detained the boxes at the request of Sanitarium on the grounds the British-made Weetabix competed with and confused the branding of their own New Zealand-made 'Weet-bix'. Sanitarium faced a backlash in New Zealand as a result. After failing to come to a settlement, Sanitarium filed civil action against the shop owner. The case hearing began in the High Court at Christchurch on 30 July 2018.

Tax exemption
Neither the Australia nor the New Zealand Sanitarium companies pay company tax on their profits, due to their ownership by a religious organisation. On their official website, Sanitarium defend their tax exemption with several points, stating they operate exclusively for charitable purposes, and that income tax exemptions are available to all companies and individuals in New Zealand who limit themselves to charitable purposes. However, the exemption has been criticised and is considered unfair by their competitors.

According to their last annual return as of February 2019, businesses operated by the Seventh-day Adventist Church reported more than $10 million profit.

Products

Up & Go
Up & Go is the brand of a range of liquid breakfast products manufactured and marketed by Sanitarium Health and Wellbeing Company. The brand was the first product that established the category of liquid breakfast in supermarket and convenience stores in Australia and New Zealand.  Many other brands have entered the category since the late 1990s, and forced the brand to defend its market share.

In June 2013, Choice magazine released a study of 23 liquid breakfast products questioning the validity of claims that were made by manufacturers including Up & Go claims regarding fibre content. Sanitarium defended Up & Go in a release citing the current code of practice for nutrient claims that a product must contain a minimum of 3 g of dietary fibre per serving to be considered "high in fiber" and Up & Go contained 3.8 g of fiber per 250-ml serving.

Weet-Bix

Weet-Bix is a wheat break cereal made in Australia and New Zealand and in South Africa by Bokomo.

Honey Puffs

Honey Puffs is a wheat break cereal coated with honey made in Australia and New Zealand.

Spreads

Marmite is a food spread made in New Zealand. It is made from yeast extract, by-product of beer brewing.

So Good (soy beverage)
So Good (also known as SoGood or So-Good) is a brand of non-dairy beverages, foods, and desserts that are lactose, cholesterol and gluten-free. So Good is manufactured by Sanitarium Health and Wellbeing Company in Australia and New Zealand. In Canada, it is prepared by Earth's Own. So Good is sold in India by Life Health Foods.

In Australia, So Good produces soy milk, as well as almond milk and almond and coconut milk. They also produce flavored soy milk and frozen soy desserts.

In India, So Good produces almond milk and almond and coconut milk, in addition to soy milk. They also produce flavoured soy milk, flavoured almond milk, and fortified soy milk.

References

Further reading
 Parr, R., & Litster, G. (1996). "What Hath God Wrought!": The Sanitarium Health Food Company Story. Sanitarium Health Food Company. . 463 pages.

External links
Sanitarium Australia
Sanitarium New Zealand

Food manufacturers of Australia
Food manufacturers of New Zealand
Vegetarian companies and establishments
1898 establishments in Australia
Food and drink companies established in 1898
Seventh-day Adventist food and drink companies